Cryptazeca is a genus of small air-breathing land snails, terrestrial gastropod mollusks in the family Azecidae.

Distribution 
The distribution of Cryptazeca species includes southwestern France, northeastern Spain (from the western Pyrenées to the Cantabrian mountains).

Species
Species within the genus Crypazeca include:
 Cryptazeca elongata Gómez, 1990
 Cryptazeca kobelti Gittenberger, 1983
 Cryptazeca monodonta (Folin & Bérillon, 1877) - type species
 Cryptazeca spelaea Gómez, 1990
 Cryptazeca subcylindrica Folin & Bérillon, 1877
 Cryptazeca vasconica (Kobelt, 1894)

References

 Bank, R. A. (2017). Classification of the Recent terrestrial Gastropoda of the World. Last update: July 16th, 2017

 
Taxonomy articles created by Polbot
Gastropod genera
Azecidae